Wardle is a civil parish in Cheshire East, England. It contains seven buildings that are recorded in the National Heritage List for England as designated listed buildings.  Of these, one is listed at Grade II*, the middle of the three grades, and the others are at Grade II.  In the parish is the junction of the Shropshire Union Canal and its Middlewich Branch, and three of the listed buildings are associated with this.  The other listed buildings are farmhouses, farm buildings, and a pinfold.

Key

Buildings

See also

Listed buildings in Bunbury
Listed buildings in Calveley
Listed buildings in Haughton
Listed buildings in Stoke

References
Citations

Sources

 

Listed buildings in the Borough of Cheshire East
Lists of listed buildings in Cheshire